Eremophila incisa is a flowering plant in the figwort family, Scrophulariaceae and is endemic to Western Australia. It is a low shrub with shiny leaves which have thickened teeth along their edges and hairy, mauve or purple flowers.

Description
The most distinctive feature of the leaves is that their margins are cut into, producing stiff, spiny teeth.

There are 5 green to purplish-brown, lance-shaped to egg-shaped overlapping sepals which are very hairy on their inner surface. The petal tube is deep purple to mauve on the outside and white with yellow-brown spots inside. The outside of the tube and petal lobes are densely hairy but the inside of the lobes is glabrous and the inside of the tube is woolly. The 4 stamens are fully enclosed in the petal tube.

Taxonomy and naming 
The species was first formally described by Robert Chinnock in 2007 and the description was published in Eremophila and Allied Genera: A Monograph of the Plant Family Myoporaceae. The specific epithet (incisa) is a Latin word meaning "made by cutting" referring to the leaves of this species.

Distribution and habitat
Eremophila incisa grows on plains in shallow soils between Newman and Meekatharra in the Gascoyne, Murchison and Pilbara biogeographic regions.

Conservation status
Eremophila incisa is classified as "not threatened" by the Western Australian Government Department of Parks and Wildlife.

References

Eudicots of Western Australia
incisa
Endemic flora of Western Australia
Plants described in 2007
Taxa named by Robert Chinnock